Jonathan Brown (born April 20, 1997) is an American racing cyclist, who currently rides for UCI Continental team . In 2018 he won the United States National Road Race Championships. He is the younger brother of Nathan Brown, who is also a cyclist.

Major results
2014
 1st  Road race, National Junior Road Championships
2015
 1st  Road race, National Junior Road Championships
2018
 1st  Road race, National Road Championships
 7th Paris–Roubaix Espoirs

References

External links

1997 births
Living people
American male cyclists
People from Murfreesboro, Tennessee
21st-century American people